Typhoon! was a Tigard, Oregon-based Thai restaurant with seven locations in the U.S. states of Oregon and Washington, including Beaverton, Bend, Gresham, and Redmond. The restaurant closed in 2012.

History
Bo and Steve Kline opened the original restaurant in northwest Portland in 1995. The restaurant was charged with unfair labor conditions in 2010. In early 2014, after the restaurant had closed, an executive was accused of stealing $1 million.

Legal issues
Typhoon! Has been sued multiple times by their employees, have been delinquent on their taxes and in September 2010, the state filed a civil suit claiming the restaurant discriminated against Thai chefs. One of their locations was seized by the landlord in February 2011 for non-payment of rent. The following month, some of their vendors sued because they weren’t being paid.

The discrimination suit also alleged human trafficking violations.  A federal arbitration panel found in favor of the chef and awarded them $268,000.  They found no evidence of human trafficking. Arbitrators award damages to former Typhoon! chef but found no evidence on the human trafficking claims.

See also

 List of defunct restaurants of the United States
 List of Thai restaurants

References

External links
 Typhoon! at Zomato

1997 establishments in Oregon
Defunct Asian restaurants in Oregon
Companies based in Tigard, Oregon
Defunct Asian restaurants in Portland, Oregon
Defunct restaurant chains in the United States
Restaurants established in 1997
Thai restaurants in the United States
Thai-American culture in Oregon
Thai-American culture in Washington (state)
Asian restaurants in Washington (state)
Restaurants in Beaverton, Oregon
Restaurants in Bend, Oregon
Gresham, Oregon
Redmond, Washington